Lebanese Surinamese people are Surinamese citizens of Lebanese origin or descent.

History 
The first Lebanese, Nicolas Karkabé, arrived in Suriname around 1890 and settled there. He began as a peddler in the countryside but became a wealthy merchant in only a short time. The next Lebanese, mostly Maronites, arrived in the 1990s from French Guiana. Within Lebanon they originate from a specific region, Bsharri, a small (agrarian based) village (Bazaoun). Within Suriname they entered the textile trade that they dominate at present. The modest migration to Suriname continues to this day and this small group of Lebanese expatriates now counts 500 members.

Notes

References
G.A. de Bruĳne J. Veltkamp, 2006, Libanese Surinamers, Leiden, 

Ethnic groups in Suriname
Lebanese diaspora in South America
Suriname